Wyszki may refer to the following places in Poland:
Wyszki, Lower Silesian Voivodeship (south-west Poland)
Wyszki, Podlaskie Voivodeship (north-east Poland)
Wyszki, Greater Poland Voivodeship (west-central Poland)